Pteria (before 1926: Άνω Παπράτσκο - Ano Papratsko) is a village in Kastoria Regional Unit, Macedonia, Greece.

The Greek census (1920) recorded 454 people in the village and in 1923 there were 450 inhabitants (or 60 families) who were Muslim. Following the Greek-Turkish population exchange, in 1926 within Papratsko there were 50 refugee families from Pontus. The Greek census (1928) recorded 294 village inhabitants. There were 49 refugee families (194 people) in 1928.

References

Populated places in Kastoria (regional unit)